Chinese knotting, also known as  and decorative knots in non-Chinese cultures, is a decorative handcraft art that began as a form of Chinese folk art in the Tang and Song dynasty (960–1279 CE) in China. This form of craft originated and was derived from the  culture which already existed in China since the ancient times. As a form of art, it is also called Chinese traditional decorative knots. Chinese knotting was later popularized in the Ming and spread to Japan and Korea. There are many different shapes of Chinese knots, the most common being butterflies, flowers, birds, dragons, fish, and even shoes. Culturally they were expected to ward off evil spirits similar to bagua mirrors or act as good-luck charms for Chinese marriages. Around the time of the Chinese new year festival, Chinese knot decorations can be seen hanging on walls, the doors of homes, and as shop decorations to add some festival feel. Usually, these decorations are red in colour, which is a colour associated with "luck" in traditional Chinese culture.

Forming the name of "Chinese knotting"

The  was not named "Chinese knotting" before the time of Lydia Chen's research. In the 1980s, Lydia Chen, known by her Chinese name as Chen Xiasheng, founded the Chinese knotting Promotion Centre, cooperated with ECHO magazine, and sought out the few remaining keepers of the knotting tradition by recording their work in a series of articles and books.

She named these knotting crafts "Chinese knots" and assembled practical manuals to disseminate the art of Chinese knotting to a broader audience. Chinese knotting has since become a popular symbol and souvenir in festivals and commodity markets.

Characteristics 

Historically, Chinese knot work is divided into cords and knots. In the dynastic periods, a certain number of craftsmen were stationed in the court and outside the court to produce cords and knots in order to meet the increasing demand for them at various places of the Imperial court. Cords, knots, and tassels were made as separate pieces and combined later.

Chinese knots are usually lanyard type arrangements where two cords enter from the top of the knot and two cords leave from the bottom. The knots are usually double-layered and symmetrical.

One major characteristic of decorative knot-work is that all the knots are tied using one piece of thread, which is usually about one meter in length. However, the finished knots look identical from both the front and back. They can come in a variety of colours such as gold, green, blue or black, though the most commonly used colour is red. This is because it symbolizes good luck and prosperity. There are many different shapes of Chinese knots.

Types and shapes 
Lydia Chen lists eleven basic types of Chinese decorative knotwork in her first book. More complex knots are constructed from repeating or combining these basic knots.

History 
Archaeological studies indicate that the art of tying knots dates back to prehistoric times. Recent discoveries include 100,000-year-old bone needles used for sewing and bodkins, which were used to untie knots. However, due to the delicate nature of the medium, few examples of prehistoric Chinese knotting exist today. Some of the earliest evidence of knotting have been preserved on bronze vessels of the Warring States period (481–221 BC), Buddhist carvings of the Northern dynasties period (317–581) and on silk paintings during the Western Han period (206 BC–9 CE).

Recording and ruling method

Based on the archaeology and literature evidence, before 476 BCE, the knots in China had a specific function: recording and ruling method, similar to the Inca Quipu. According to the 《, from the ancient times of Bao-xi ruling era, except for the use for fishing, knots were used to record and govern the community.

The Eastern Han (25–220 CE) scholar Zheng Xuan, who annotated, also wrote that:

Moreover, the chapter of Tubo (Tibet) in the New Book of Tang also recorded that:

Ancient totem and symbol 

Simultaneously, in addition to the use of recording and ruling, knots became an ancient totem and belief motif. The Chinese brought a lot of good meanings from pictograms, or quasi-sounds, to totem worship in ancient times.

An example is the double coin knot pattern painting on the T-shape silk banner discovered by archaeologists in Mawangdui tombs (206 BC – CE 9). The pattern is in the form of intertwined dragons as a double coin knot in the middle of the fabric painting. The upper part of the fabric painting depicts the ancient deities Fuxi and Nüwa, who are also the initiators of marriage in China from whom many ancient poems derive the meaning of "love" for the double coin knot.

There is tangible evidence that 3,000 years ago, on the Yinxu Oracle bone script, knots were recognized as symbols rather than functional use.

Decorative art

According to Lydia Chen, the earliest tangible evidence of using knots as a decorative motif is on a high-stem small square pot from the Spring and Autumn Period (770 – 476 BC), which is now displayed in the Shanxi Museum. Archaeology research in the last decade, however, confirmed that the earliest decorative knot artifact in China can be traced back to 4000 years ago, when a three-row rattan knotting of a double coin knot was excavated from Liangzhu Ruins.

Knots gradually evolved into a distinct decorative art in China, beginning with the use of ribbon knotting and decorative knots on clothing during the Spring and Autumn Period.

Chinese knotting was thus derived from the  culture. The Chinese word  is an ancient Chinese term for knots, and it was customary to tie a knot at the waist with silk or cotton ribbon.

Sui to Ming dynasties 
The Sui and Tang dynasties (581–906 CE) saw the first peak of the  culture when basic knots such as the Swastika knot and the round brocade knot generated the  vogue on garments and common folk art in the palace and home. Therefore, knots were cherished not only as symbols and tools but also as an essential part of everyday life to decorate and express thoughts and feelings.

In the Tang and Song dynasty (960–1279 CE), the love-based knot is a unique element, as evidenced in many of the poems, novels, and paintings. For example, in the memoir  written by Meng Yuanlao, it is observed that in the traditional wedding custom, a Concentric knot or the knot made like a Concentric knot was necessary to be held by the bride and groom. Other ancient poems mentioned the Concentric knot to portray love such as Luo Binwang's poem: 

It was also mentioned in a poem written by Huang Tingjian: 

The most famous poem about the Love knot was written by Meng Jiao in 《 – 》.

The phenomenon of knot tying continued to steadily evolve over thousands of years with the development of more sophisticated techniques and increasingly intricate woven patterns. During the Song and Yuan dynasties (960–1368), the Pan Chang knot, today's most recognizable Chinese knot, became popular. Much artwork evidence has also shown the knots as clothing decoration during the Ming dynasty (1368–1644); for instance, in Tang Yin's beautiful paintings, a knotting ribbon is clearly shown.

Qing dynasty 
During the Qing dynasty (1644–1911), Chinese knotting evolved from folklore to an acceptable art form in Chinese society, reaching its pinnacle of success. The  culture then reached a second peak during the Qing dynasty.

It was also a form honourable craftsmanship studied and created by maids in the Imperial Palace; as written in the 《》, when knotting, the maids amusing for Ci Xi were able to quickly produce objects of various kinds proficient.”

Republic of China 
In the period of the Republic of China (1912–1949), knots can be seen from modern Chinese style without intricate and over decorative.

21st century 

Influences and derivatives

Japan

The  is a legacy of the Tang dynasty of China when a Japanese Emperor in the 7th century was so impressed by Chinese knots which were used to tie a gift from the Chinese that he started to encourage Japanese people to adopt the tying knots practice.

Japanese knots are more austere and formal, simple, structurally looser than the Chinese knots. In function, Japanese knots are more decorative than functional. With a greater emphasis on the braids that are used to create the knots, Japanese knotting tends to focus on individual knots.

Korea

The Korean knotting techniques is believed to originate from China, but Korean knots evolved into its own rich culture as to design, colour and incorporation of local characteristics. The origins of  date back to the Three Kingdoms of Korea in the first century CE.  articles were first used at religious ceremonies.

A wall painting found in Anak, Hwanghae Province, now in North Korea, dated 357 CE, indicates that the work was flourishing in silk at that time. Decorative cording was used on silk dresses, to ornament swords, to hang personal items from belts for the aristocracy, in rituals, where it continues now in contemporary wedding ceremonies. Korean knotwork is differentiated from Korean embroidery.  is still a commonly practice traditional art, especially among the older generations.

The  knot is used at the start and end of most knot projects. There are approximately 33 basic Korean knots which vary according to the region they come from. The  tassel is noteworthy as the most representative work familiar to Westerners, and often purchased as souvenirs for macramé-style wall-hangings.

Related content 

 Endless knot
 China:; 
 Japan: Mizuhiki
 Korea: Norigae

See also 
 Chinese art
 Chinese Folk Art
 Chinese paper cutting
 Chinese paper folding
 List of Japanese tea ceremony equipment#Shifuku
 Macrame

References

External links 
 

Arts in China
Arts in Japan
Arts in Korea
Chinese folk art
Decorative knots
East Asian art